KAUD may refer to:

 Kommunistische Arbeiter-Union Deutschlands
 KAUD (FM), a radio station in Mexico, Missouri